The Château de Meillant is a historic manor in Meillant, Cher, Centre-Val de Loire, France.

History
It was built in the 15th century.

Architectural significance
It has been listed as an official monument since 1963.

References

Châteaux in Cher
Monuments historiques of Centre-Val de Loire